Konary  ( or ) is a village in the administrative district of Gmina Wińsko, within Wołów County, Lower Silesian Voivodeship, in south-western Poland.

Under Prussian rule, the world's first factory for extracting sugar from sugar beets was opened in 1802 in Konary (then known as Kunern).

References

Villages in Wołów County